Okapilco Creek is a  tributary of the Withlacoochee River in the U.S. state of Georgia.  Via the Withlacoochee and the Suwannee River, the waters of Okapilco Creek flow to the Gulf of Mexico.

See also
List of rivers of Georgia

References 

USGS Hydrologic Unit Map - State of Georgia (1974)

Rivers of Georgia (U.S. state)
Rivers of Worth County, Georgia
Rivers of Colquitt County, Georgia
Rivers of Brooks County, Georgia